Kwon Yang-sook (born December 23, 1947) was the First Lady of South Korea from 2003 to 2008. She is the widow of the ninth president of South Korea, Roh Moo-hyun, who committed suicide on May 23, 2009.

Career
She is a Buddhist, with the Dharma name Daedeokhwa, and won support from the Buddhist community during her husband's presidential campaign.

After Roh's term ended, Kwon was embroiled in a bribery scandal involving her husband. According to Roh's website, Kwon borrowed $1 million from Park Yeon-Cha, CEO of Taekwang Industry, to repay a personal debt.

Impostor
In November 2018, a woman falsely claiming to be Kwon Yang-sook convinced the mayor of Gwanju at the time, Yoon Jang-hyun, to transfer her 450 million won. According to reports, the impostor claimed that she needed the requested money for her daughter and would pay it back hastily.

Gallery

References

1947 births
Living people
People from South Gyeongsang Province
First Ladies of South Korea
South Korean Buddhists